The Linux kernel is a free and open-source, monolithic, modular, multitasking, Unix-like operating system kernel. It was originally authored in 1991 by Linus Torvalds for his i386-based PC, and it was soon adopted as the kernel for the GNU operating system, which was written to be a free (libre) replacement for Unix.

Linux is provided under the GNU General Public License version 2 only, but it contains files under other compatible licenses. Since the late 1990s, it has been included as part of a large number of operating system distributions, many of which are commonly also called Linux.

Linux is deployed on a wide variety of computing systems, such as embedded devices, mobile devices (including its use in the Android operating system), personal computers, servers, mainframes, and supercomputers. It can be tailored for specific architectures and for several usage scenarios using a family of simple commands (that is, without the need of manually editing its source code before compilation); privileged users can also fine-tune kernel parameters at runtime. Most of the Linux kernel code is written using the GNU extensions of GCC to the standard C programming language and with the use of architecture-specific instructions (ISA) in limited parts of the kernel. This produces a highly optimized executable (vmlinux) with respect to utilization of memory space and task execution times.

Day-to-day development discussions take place on the Linux kernel mailing list (LKML). Changes are tracked using the version control system git, which was originally authored by Torvalds as a free software replacement for BitKeeper.

History 

In April 1991, Linus Torvalds, at the time a 21-year-old computer science student at the University of Helsinki, Finland, started working on some simple ideas for an operating system inspired by UNIX, for a personal computer. He started with a task switcher in Intel 80386 assembly language and a terminal driver. On 25 August 1991, Torvalds posted the following to comp.os.minix, a newsgroup on Usenet:

On 17 September 1991, Torvalds prepared version 0.01 of Linux and put on the "ftp.funet.fi" – FTP server of the Finnish University and Research Network (FUNET). It was not even executable since its code still needed Minix to compile and to test it.

On 5 October 1991, Torvalds announced the first "official" version of Linux, version 0.02. At this point, Linux was able to run Bash, GCC, and some other GNU utilities:

After that, despite the limited functionality of the early versions, Linux rapidly gained developers and users. Many people contributed code to the project, including some developers from the MINIX community. At the time, the GNU Project had created many of the components required for its free UNIX replacement, the GNU operating system, but its own kernel, GNU Hurd, was incomplete. For this reason, it soon adopted the Linux kernel as well. The Berkeley Software Distribution had not yet freed itself from legal encumbrances and was not competing in the space for a free OS kernel.

Torvalds assigned version 0 to the kernel to indicate that it was mainly for testing and not intended for productive use. Version 0.11, released in December 1991, was the first self-hosted Linux, for it could be compiled by a computer running the same kernel.

When Torvalds released version 0.12 in February 1992, he adopted the GNU General Public License version 2 (GPLv2) over his previous self-drafted license, which had not permitted commercial redistribution. In contrast to Unix, all source files of Linux are freely available, including device drivers. The initial success of Linux was driven by programmers and testers across the world. With the support of the POSIX APIs, through the libC that, whether needed, acts as an entry point to the kernel address space, Linux could run software and applications that had been developed for Unix.

On 19 January 1992, the first post to the new newsgroup alt.os.linux was submitted. On 31 March 1992, the newsgroup was renamed comp.os.linux. The fact that Linux is a monolithic kernel rather than a microkernel was the topic of a debate between Andrew S. Tanenbaum, the creator of MINIX, and Torvalds. The Tanenbaum–Torvalds debate started in 1992 on the Usenet group comp.os.minix as a general discussion about kernel architectures.

Linux version 0.95 was the first to be capable of running the X Window System. In March 1994, Linux 1.0.0 was released with 176,250 lines of code. It was the first version suitable for use in production environments.

It started a versioning system for the kernel with three or four numbers separated by dots where the first represented the major release, the second was the minor release, and the third was the revision. At that time odd-numbered minor releases were for development and tests, whilst even numbered minor releases were for production. The optional fourth digit indicated a set of patches to a revision. Development releases were indicated with -rc ("release candidate") suffix.

The current version numbering is slightly different from the above. The even vs. odd numbering has been dropped, and a specific major version is now indicated by the first two numbers, taken as a whole. While the time-frame is open for the development of the next major, the -rcN suffix is used to identify the n'th release candidate for the next version. For example, the release of the version 4.16 was preceded by seven 4.16-rcN (from -rc1 to -rc7). Once a stable release is made, its maintenance is passed off to the "stable team". Occasional updates to stable releases are identified by a three numbering scheme (e.g., 4.13.1, 4.13.2, ..., 4.13.16).

After version 1.3 of the kernel, Torvalds decided that Linux had evolved enough to warrant a new major number, so he released version 2.0.0 in June 1996. The series included 41 releases. The major feature of 2.0 was support for symmetric multiprocessing (SMP) and support for more types of processors.

Starting with version 2.0, Linux is configurable for selecting specific hardware targets and for enabling architecture-specific features and optimizations. The make *config family of commands of kbuild are used to enable and configure thousands of options for building ad hoc kernel executables (vmlinux) and loadable modules.

Version 2.2, released on 20 January 1999, improved locking granularity and SMP management, added m68k, PowerPC, Sparc64, Alpha, and other 64-bit platforms support. Furthermore, it added new file systems including Microsoft's NTFS read-only capability. In 1999, IBM published its patches to the Linux 2.2.13 code for the support of the S/390 architecture.

Version 2.4.0, released on 4 January 2001, contained support for ISA Plug and Play, USB, and PC Cards. Linux 2.4 added support for the Pentium 4 and Itanium (the latter introduced the ia64 ISA that was jointly developed by Intel and Hewlett-Packard to supersede the older PA-RISC), and for the newer 64-bit MIPS processor. Development for 2.4.x changed a bit in that more features were made available throughout the duration of the series, including support for Bluetooth, Logical Volume Manager (LVM) version 1, RAID support, InterMezzo and ext3 file systems.

Version 2.6.0 was released on 17 December 2003. The development for 2.6.x changed further towards including new features throughout the duration of the series. Among the changes that have been made in the 2.6 series are: integration of µClinux into the mainline kernel sources, PAE support, support for several new lines of CPUs, integration of Advanced Linux Sound Architecture (ALSA) into the mainline kernel sources, support for up to 232 users (up from 216), support for up to 229 process IDs (64-bit only, 32-bit arches still limited to 215), substantially increased the number of device types and the number of devices of each type, improved 64-bit support, support for file systems which support file sizes of up to 16 terabytes, in-kernel preemption, support for the Native POSIX Thread Library (NPTL), User-mode Linux integration into the mainline kernel sources, SELinux integration into the mainline kernel sources, InfiniBand support, and considerably more.

Also notable are the addition of a wide selection of file systems starting with the 2.6.x releases: now, the kernel supports a large number of file systems, some that have been designed for Linux, like ext3, ext4, FUSE, Btrfs, and others that are native of other operating systems like JFS, XFS, Minix, Xenix, Irix, Solaris, System V, Windows and MS-DOS.

In 2005 the stable team was formed as a response to the lack of a kernel tree where people could work on bug fixes, and it would keep updating stable versions. In February 2008 the linux-next tree was created to serve as a place where patches aimed to be merged during the next development cycle gathered. Several subsystem maintainers also adopted the suffix -next for trees containing code which they mean to submit for inclusion in the next release cycle. , the in-development version of Linux is held in an unstable branch named linux-next.

Linux used to be maintained without the help of an automated source code management system until, in 2002, development switched to BitKeeper. It was freely available for Linux developers but it was not free software. In 2005, because of efforts to reverse-engineer it, the company which owned the software revoked its support of the Linux community. In response, Torvalds and others wrote Git. The new system was written within weeks, and in two months the first official kernel made using it was released.

Details on the history of the 2.6 kernel series can be found in the ChangeLog files on the 2.6 kernel series source code release area of kernel.org.

The 20th anniversary of Linux was celebrated by Torvalds in July 2011 with the release of the 3.0.0 kernel version. As 2.6 had been the version number for 8 years, a new uname26 personality that reports 3.x as 2.6.40+x had to be added to the kernel so that old programs would work.

Version 3.0 was released on 22 July 2011. On 30 May 2011, Torvalds announced that the big change was "NOTHING. Absolutely nothing." and asked, "...let's make sure we really make the next release not just an all new shiny number, but a good kernel too." After the expected 6–7 weeks of the development process, it would be released near the 20th anniversary of Linux.

On 11 December 2012, Torvalds decided to reduce kernel complexity by removing support for i386 processors, making the 3.7 kernel series the last one still supporting the original processor. The same series unified support for the ARM processor.

The numbering change from 2.6.39 to 3.0, and from 3.19 to 4.0, involved no meaningful technical differentiation. The major version number was increased to avoid large minor numbers. Stable 3.x.y kernels were released until 3.19 in February 2015.

In April 2015, Torvalds released kernel version 4.0. By February 2015, Linux had received contributions from nearly 12,000 programmers from more than 1,200 companies, including some of the world's largest software and hardware vendors. Version 4.1 of Linux, released in June 2015, contains over 19.5 million lines of code contributed by almost 14,000 programmers.

A total of 1,991 developers, of whom 334 were first-time collaborators, added more than 553,000 lines of code to version 5.8, breaking the record previously held by version 4.9.

According to the Stack Overflow's annual Developer Survey of 2019, more than the 53% of all respondents have developed software for Linux and about 27% for Android, although only about 25% develop with Linux-based operating systems.

Most websites run on Linux-based operating systems, and all of the world's 500 most powerful supercomputers use some kind of OS based on Linux.

Linux distributions bundle the kernel with system software (e.g., the GNU C Library, systemd, and others Unix utilities and daemons) and a wide selection of application software, but their usage share in desktops is low in comparison to other operating systems.

Android, which accounts for the majority of the installed base of all operating systems for mobile devices, is responsible for the rising usage of the Linux kernel, together with its wide use in a large variety of embedded devices.

Architecture and features 

Linux is a monolithic kernel with a modular design (e.g., it can insert and remove loadable kernel modules at runtime), supporting most features once only available in closed source kernels of non-free operating systems. The rest of the article makes use of the UNIX and Unix-like operating systems convention on the official manual pages. The numbers that follow the name of commands, interfaces, and other features, have the purpose of specifying the section (i.e., the type of the OS' component or feature) they belong to (e.g.,  refers to a system call, while  refers to a userspace library wrapper). The following list and the subsequent sections describe a non-comprehensive overview of Linux architectural design and of some of its noteworthy features.
 Concurrent computing and (with the availability of enough CPU cores for tasks that are ready to run) even true parallel execution of many processes at once (each of them having one or more threads of execution) on SMP and NUMA architectures.
 Selection and configuration of hundreds of kernel features and drivers (using one of the  family of commands, before running compilation), modification of kernel parameters before booting (usually by inserting instructions into the lines of the GRUB2 menu), and fine tuning of kernel behavior at run-time (using the  interface to ).
 Advanced memory management with paged virtual memory.
 Inter-process communications and synchronization mechanism.
 A virtual filesystem on top of several concrete filesystems (ext4, Btrfs, XFS, JFS, FAT32, and many more).
 Configurable I/O schedulers,  syscall that manipulates the underlying device parameters of special files (it is a non standard system call, since arguments, returns, and semantics depends on the device driver in question), support for POSIX asynchronous I/O (however, because they scale poorly with multithreaded applications, a family of Linux specific I/O system calls had to be created for the management of asynchronous I/O contexts suitable for concurrently processing).
 OS-level virtualization (with Linux-VServer), paravirtualization and hardware-assisted virtualization (with KVM or Xen, and using QEMU for hardware emulation); On the Xen hypervisor, the Linux kernel provides support to build Linux distributions (such as openSuSE Leap and many others) that work as Dom0, that are virtual machine host servers that provide the management environment for the user's virtual machines (DomU).
I/O Virtualization with VFIO and SR-IOV. Virtual Function I/O (VFIO) exposes direct device access to user space in a secure memory (IOMMU) protected environment. With VFIO, a VM Guest can directly access hardware devices on the VM Host Server. This technique improves performance, if compared both to Full virtualization and Paravirtualization. However, with VFIO, devices cannot be shared with multiple VM guests. Single Root I/O Virtualization (SR-IOV) combines the performance gains of VFIO and the ability to share a device with several VM Guests (but it requires special hardware that must be capable to appear to two or more VM guests as different devices).
 Security mechanisms for discretionary and mandatory access control (SELinux, AppArmor, POSIX ACLs, and others).
 Several types of layered communication protocols (including the Internet protocol suite).
 Asymmetric multiprocessing via the RPMsg subsystem.

Most device drivers and kernel extensions run in kernel space (ring 0 in many CPU architectures), with full access to the hardware. Some exceptions run in user space; notable examples are filesystems based on FUSE/CUSE, and parts of UIO. Furthermore, the X Window System and Wayland, the windowing system and display server protocols that most people use with Linux, do not run within the kernel. Differently, the actual interfacing with GPUs of graphics cards is an in-kernel subsystem called Direct Rendering Manager (DRM).

Unlike standard monolithic kernels, device drivers are easily configured as modules, and loaded or unloaded while the system is running and can also be pre-empted under certain conditions in order to handle hardware interrupts correctly and to better support symmetric multiprocessing. By choice, Linux has no stable device driver application binary interface.

Linux typically makes use of memory protection and virtual memory and can also handle non-uniform memory access, however the project has absorbed μClinux which also makes it possible to run Linux on microcontrollers without virtual memory.

The hardware is represented in the file hierarchy. Processes information as well are mapped to the file system through the  directory.

Interfaces 

Linux is a clone of UNIX, and aims toward POSIX and Single UNIX Specification compliance. The kernel also provides system calls and other interfaces that are Linux-specific. In order to be included in the official kernel, the code must comply with a set of licensing rules.

The Linux Application binary interface (ABI) between the kernel and the user space has four degrees of stability (stable, testing, obsolete, removed); however, the system calls are expected to never change in order to not break the userspace programs that rely on them.

Loadable kernel modules (LKMs), by design, cannot rely on a stable ABI. Therefore, they must always be recompiled whenever a new kernel executable is installed in a system, otherwise they will not be loaded. In-tree drivers that are configured to become an integral part of the kernel executable (vmlinux) are statically linked by the building process.

There is also no guarantee of stability of source-level in-kernel API and, because of this, device drivers code, as well as the code of any other kernel subsystem, must be kept updated with kernel evolution. Any developer who makes an API change is required to fix any code that breaks as the result of their change.

Kernel-to-userspace API 
The set of the Linux kernel API that regards the interfaces exposed to user applications is fundamentally composed of UNIX and Linux-specific system calls. A system call is an entry point into the Linux kernel. For example, among the Linux-specific ones there is the family of the  system calls. Most extensions must be enabled by defining the _GNU_SOURCE macro in a header file or when the user-land code is being compiled.

System calls can only be invoked by using assembly instructions which enable the transition from unprivileged user space to privileged kernel space in ring 0. For this reason, the C standard library (libC) acts as a wrapper to most Linux system calls, by exposing C functions that, only whether it is needed, can transparently enter into the kernel which will execute on behalf of the calling process. For those system calls not exposed by libC, e.g. the fast userspace mutex (futex), the library provides a function called  which can be used to explicitly invoke them.

Pseudo filesystems (e.g., the sysfs and procfs filesystems) and special files (e.g., /dev/random, /dev/sda, /dev/tty, and many others) constitute another layer of interface to kernel data structures representing hardware or logical (software) devices.

Kernel-to-userspace ABI 
Because of the differences existing between the hundreds of various implementations of the Linux OS, executable objects, even though they are compiled, assembled, and linked for running on a specific hardware architecture (that is, they use the ISA of the target hardware), often cannot run on different Linux Distributions. This issue is mainly due to distribution-specific configurations and a set of patches applied to the code of the Linux kernel, differences in system libraries, services (daemons), filesystem hierarchies, and environment variables.

The main standard concerning application and binary compatibility of Linux distributions is the Linux Standard Base (LSB). However, the LSB goes beyond what concerns the Linux kernel, because it also defines the desktop specifications, the X libraries and Qt that have little to do with it. The LSB version 5 is built upon several standards and drafts (POSIX, SUS, X/Open, File System Hierarchy (FHS), and others).

The parts of the LSB largely relevant to the kernel are the General ABI (gABI), especially the System V ABI and the Executable and Linking Format (ELF), and the Processor Specific ABI (psABI), for example the Core Specification for X86-64.

The standard ABI for how x86_64 user programs invoke system calls is to load the syscall number into the rax register, and the other parameters into rdi, rsi, rdx, r10, r8, and r9, and finally to put the syscall assembly instruction in the code.

In-kernel API 

There are several kernel internal APIs utilized between the different subsystems.

Linux provides in-kernel APIs that manipulate data structures (e.g., linked lists, radix trees, red-black trees, queues) or perform common routines (e.g., copy data from and to user space, allocate memory, print lines to the system log, and so on) that have remained stable at least since Linux version 2.6.

In-kernel APIs include libraries of low-level common services used by device drivers:
 SCSI Interfaces and libATA respectively, a peer-to-peer packet based communication protocol for storage devices attached to USB, SATA, SAS, Fibre Channel, FireWire, ATAPI device, and an in-kernel library to support [S]ATA host controllers and devices.
 Direct Rendering Manager (DRM) and Kernel Mode Setting (KMS) for interfacing with GPUs and supporting the needs of modern 3D-accelerated video hardware, and for setting screen resolution, color depth and refresh rate
 DMA buffers (DMA-BUF) for sharing buffers for hardware direct memory access across multiple device drivers and subsystems
 Video4Linux for video capture hardware
 Advanced Linux Sound Architecture (ALSA) for sound cards
 New API for network interface controllers
 mac80211 and cfg80211 - for wireless network interface controllers

In-kernel ABI 
The Linux developers chose not to maintain a stable in-kernel ABI. Modules compiled for a specific version of the kernel cannot be loaded into another version without being recompiled, assuming that the in-kernel API has remained the same at the source level; otherwise, the module code must also be modified accordingly.

Processes and threads 
Depending on the given parameters, the new entity can share most or none of the resources of the caller. These syscalls can create new entities ranging from new independent processes (each having a special identifier called TGID within the task_struct data structure in kernel space, although that same identifier is called PID in userspace), to new threads of execution within the calling process (by using the  parameter). In this latter case the new entity owns the same TGID of the calling process and consequently has also the same PID in userspace.

If the executable is dynamically linked to shared libraries, a dynamic linker (for ELF objects, it is typically ) is used to find and load the needed objects, prepare the program to run and then run it.

The Native POSIX Thread Library, simply known as the NPTL, provides the standard POSIX threads interface (pthreads) to userspace. Whenever a new thread is created using the pthread_create(3) POSIX interface, the  family of system calls must also be given the address of the function that the new thread must jump to.

A very special category of threads is the so-called kernel threads. They must not be confused with the above-mentioned threads of execution of the user's processes. Kernel threads exist only in kernel space and their only purpose is to concurrently run kernel tasks.

Differently, whenever an independent process is created, the syscalls return exactly to the next instruction of the same program, concurrently in parent process and in child's one (i.e., one program, two processes). Different return values (one per process) enable the program to know in which of the two processes it is currently executing. Programs need this information because the child process, a few steps after process duplication, usually invokes the  system call (possibly via the family of  wrapper functions in glibC) and replace the program that is currently being run by the calling process with a new program, with newly initialized stack, heap, and (initialized and uninitialized) data segments. When it is done, it results in two processes that run two different programs.

Depending on the effective user id (euid), and on the effective group id (egid), a process running with user zero privileges (root, the system administrator, owns the identifier 0) can perform everything (e.g., kill all the other processes or recursively wipe out whole filesystems), instead non zero user processes cannot.  divides the privileges traditionally associated with superuser into distinct units, which can be independently enabled and disabled by the parent process or dropped by the child itself.

Scheduling and preemption 

The Linux scheduler is modular, in the sense that it enables different scheduling classes and policies. Scheduler classes are plugable scheduler algorithms that can be registered with the base scheduler code. Each class schedules different types of processes. The core code of the scheduler iterates over each class in order of priority and chooses the highest priority scheduler that has a schedulable entity of type struct sched_entity ready to run. Entities may be threads, group of threads, and even all the processes of a specific user.

Linux provides both user preemption as well as full kernel preemption. Preemption reduces latency, increases responsiveness, and makes Linux more suitable for desktop and real-time applications.

For normal tasks, by default, the kernel uses the Completely Fair Scheduler (CFS) class, introduced in the 2.6.23 version of the kernel. Internally this default-scheduler class is defined in a macro of a C header as SCHED_NORMAL. In other POSIX kernels, a similar policy known as SCHED_OTHER allocates CPU timeslices (i.e, it assigns absolute slices of the processor time depending on either predetermined or dynamically computed priority of each process). The Linux CFS does away with absolute timeslices and assigns a fair proportion of CPU time, as a function of parameters like the total number of runnable processes and the time they have already run; this function also takes into account a kind of weight that depends on their relative priorities (nice values).

With user preemption, the kernel scheduler can replace the current process with the execution of a context switch to a different one that therefore acquires the computing resources for running (CPU, memory, and more). It makes it according to the CFS algorithm (in particular, it uses a variable called  for sorting entities and then chooses the one that has the smaller vruntime, - i.e., the schedulable entity that has had the least share of CPU time), to the active scheduler policy and to the relative priorities. With kernel preemption, the kernel can preempt itself when an interrupt handler returns, when kernel tasks block, and whenever a subsystem explicitly calls the schedule() function.

The kernel also contains two POSIX-compliant real-time scheduling classes named SCHED_FIFO (realtime first-in-first-out) and SCHED_RR (realtime round-robin), both of which take precedence over the default class. An additional scheduling policy known as SCHED DEADLINE, implementing the earliest deadline first algorithm (EDF), was added in kernel version 3.14, released on 30 March 2014. SCHED_DEADLINE takes precedence over all the other scheduling classes.

Real-time PREEMPT_RT patches, included into the mainline Linux since version 2.6, provide a deterministic scheduler, the removal of preemption and interrupts disabling (where possible), PI Mutexes (i.e., locking primitives that avoid priority inversion), support for high precision event timers (HPET), preemptive Read-copy-update, (forced) IRQ threads, and other minor features.

Concurrency and synchronization 
The kernel has different causes of concurrency (e.g., interrupts, bottom halves, preemption of kernel and users tasks, symmetrical multiprocessing). For protecting critical regions (sections of code that must be executed atomically), shared memory locations (like global variables and other data structures with global scope), and regions of memory that are asynchronously modifiable by hardware (e.g., having the C volatile type qualifier), Linux provides a large set of tools. They consist of atomic types (which can only be manipulated by a set of specific operators), spinlocks, semaphores, mutexes, and lockless algorithms (e.g., RCUs). Most lock-less algorithms are built on top of memory barriers for the purpose of enforcing memory ordering and prevent undesired side effects due to compiler optimization.

PREEMPT_RT code included in mainline Linux provide RT-mutexes, a special kind of Mutex which do not disable preemption and have support for priority inheritance. Almost all locks are changed into sleeping locks when using configuration for realtime operation. Priority inheritance avoids priority inversion by granting a low-priority task which holds a contended lock the priority of a higher-priority waiter until that lock is released.

Linux includes a kernel lock validator called Lockdep.

Interrupts management 
The management of the interrupts, although it could be seen as a single job, is divided in two separate parts. This split in two is due to the different time constraints and to the synchronization needs of the tasks whose the management is composed of. The first part is made up of an asynchronous interrupt service routine that in Linux is known as the top half, while the second part is carried out by one of three types of the so-called bottom halves (softirq, tasklets, and work queues). Linux interrupts service routines can be nested (i.e., a new IRQ can trap into a high priority ISR that preempts any other lower priority ISRs).

Memory management 

Memory management in Linux is a complex topic. First of all, the kernel is not pageable (i.e., it is always resident in physical memory and cannot be swapped to the disk). In the kernel there is no memory protection (no SIGSEGV signals, unlike in userspace), therefore memory violations lead to instability and system crashes.

Linux implements virtual memory with 4 and 5-levels page tables. As said, only user memory space is always pageable. It maintains information about each page frame of RAM in apposite data structures (of type ) that are populated immediately after boots and that are kept until shutdown, regardless of them being or not associated with virtual pages. Furthermore, it classifies all page frames in zones, according to their architecture dependent constraints and intended use. For example, pages reserved for DMA operations are in ZONE_DMA, pages that are not permanently mapped to virtual addresses are in ZONE_HIGHMEM (in x86_32 architecture this zone is for physical addresses above 896 MB, while x86_64 does not need it because x86_64 can permanently map physical pages that reside in higher addresses), and all that remains (with the exception of other less used classifications) is in ZONE_NORMAL.

Small chunks of memory can be dynamically allocated via the family of kmalloc() API and freed with the appropriate variant of kfree(). vmalloc() and kvfree() are used for large virtually contiguous chunks. alloc_pages() allocates the desired number of entire pages.

Kernel includes SLAB, SLUB and SLOB allocators as configurable alternatives. SLUB is the newest and it is also the default allocator. It aims for simplicity and efficiency. SLUB has been made PREEMPT_RT compatible.

Supported architectures 

While not originally designed to be portable, Linux is now one of the most widely ported operating system kernels, running on a diverse range of systems from the ARM architecture to IBM z/Architecture mainframe computers. The first port was performed on the Motorola 68000 platform. The modifications to the kernel were so fundamental that Torvalds viewed the Motorola version as a fork and a "Linux-like operating system". However, that moved Torvalds to lead a major restructure of the code to facilitate porting to more computing architectures. The first Linux that, in a single source tree, had code for more than i386 alone, supported the DEC Alpha AXP 64-bit platform.

Linux has also been ported to various handheld devices such as Apple's iPhone 3G and iPod.

Supported devices 
In 2007, the LKDDb project has been started to build a comprehensive database of hardware and protocols known by Linux kernels. The database is built automatically by static analysis of the kernel sources. Later in 2014, the Linux Hardware project was launched to automatically collect a database of all tested hardware configurations with the help of users of various Linux distributions.

Live patching 
Rebootless updates can even be applied to the kernel by using live patching technologies such as Ksplice, kpatch and kGraft. Minimalistic foundations for live kernel patching were merged into the Linux kernel mainline in kernel version 4.0, which was released on 12 April 2015. Those foundations, known as livepatch and based primarily on the kernel's ftrace functionality, form a common core capable of supporting hot patching by both kGraft and kpatch, by providing an application programming interface (API) for kernel modules that contain hot patches and an application binary interface (ABI) for the userspace management utilities. However, the common core included into Linux kernel 4.0 supports only the x86 architecture and does not provide any mechanisms for ensuring function-level consistency while the hot patches are applied. , there is ongoing work on porting kpatch and kGraft to the common live patching core provided by the Linux kernel mainline.

Security 
Kernel bugs present potential security issues. For example, they may allow for privilege escalation or create denial-of-service attack vectors. Over the years, numerous bugs affecting system security were found and fixed. New features are frequently implemented to improve the kernel's security.

Capabilities(7) have already been introduced in the section about the processes and threads. Android makes use of them and systemd gives administrators detailed control over the capabilities of processes.

Linux offers a wealth of mechanisms to reduce kernel attack surface and improve security which are collectively known as the Linux Security Modules (LSM). They comprise the Security-Enhanced Linux (SELinux) module, whose code has been originally developed and then released to the public by the NSA, and AppArmor among others. SELinux is now actively developed and maintained on GitHub. SELinux and AppArmor provide support to access control security policies, including mandatory access control (MAC), though they profoundly differ in complexity and scope.

Another security feature is the Seccomp BPF (SECure COMPuting with Berkeley Packet Filters) which works by filtering parameters and reducing the set of system calls available to user-land applications.

Critics have accused kernel developers of covering up security flaws, or at least not announcing them; in 2008, Linus Torvalds responded to this with the following:

Linux distributions typically release security updates to fix vulnerabilities in the Linux kernel. Many offer long-term support releases that receive security updates for a certain Linux kernel version for an extended period of time.

Development

Developer community 
The community of Linux kernel developers comprises about 5000–6000 members. According to the "2017 State of Linux Kernel Development", a study issued by the Linux Foundation, covering the commits for the releases 4.8 to 4.13, about 1500 developers were contributing from about 200-250 companies on average. The top 30 developers contributed a little more than 16% of the code. For companies, the top contributors are Intel (13.1%) and Red Hat (7.2%), Linaro (5.6%), IBM (4.1%), the second and fifth places are held by the 'none' (8.2%) and 'unknown' (4.1%) categories.

As with many large open-source software projects, developers are required to adhere to the Contributor Covenant, a code of conduct intended to address harassment of minority contributors. Additionally, to prevent offense the use of inclusive terminology within the source code is mandated.

Source code management 
The Linux development community uses Git to manage the source code. Contributions are submitted as patches, in the form of text messages on the LKML (and often also on other mailing lists dedicated to particular subsystems). The patches must conform to a set of rules and to a formal language that, among other things, describes which lines of code are to be deleted and what others are to be added to the specified files. These patches can be automatically processed so that system administrators can apply them in order to make just some changes to the code or to incrementally upgrade to the next version. Linux is distributed also in GNU zip (gzip) and bzip2 formats.

Submitting code to the kernel 
A developer who wants to change the Linux kernel starts with developing and testing that change. Depending on how significant the change is and how many subsystems it modifies, the change will either be submitted as a single patch or in multiple patches of source code. In case of a single subsystem that is maintained by a single maintainer, these patches are sent as e-mails to the maintainer of the subsystem with the appropriate mailing list in Cc. The maintainer and the readers of the mailing list will review the patches and provide feedback. Once the review process has finished the subsystem maintainer accepts the patches in the relevant Git kernel tree. If the changes to the Linux kernel are bug fixes that are considered important enough, a pull request for the patches will be sent to Torvalds within a few days. Otherwise, a pull request will be sent to Torvalds during the next merge window. The merge window usually lasts two weeks and starts immediately after the release of the previous kernel version. The Git kernel source tree names all developers who have contributed to the Linux kernel in the Credits directory and all subsystem maintainers are listed in Maintainers.

Programming language and coding style 

Linux is written in a special C programming language supported by GCC, a compiler that extends in many ways the C standard, for example using inline sections of code written in the assembly language (in GCC's "AT&T-style" syntax) of the target architecture. Since 2002 all the code must adhere to the 21 rules comprising the Linux Kernel Coding Style.

GNU toolchain 
The GNU Compiler Collection (GCC or GNU cc) is the default compiler for the mainline Linux sources and it is invoked by a utility called make. Then, the GNU Assembler (more often called GAS or GNU as) outputs the object files from the GCC generated assembly code. Finally, the GNU Linker (GNU ld) is used to produce a statically linked executable kernel file called . The above-mentioned tools are collectively known as the GNU toolchain.

Compiler compatibility 
GCC was for a long time the only compiler capable of correctly building Linux. In 2004, Intel claimed to have modified the kernel so that its C compiler was also capable of compiling it. There was another such reported success in 2009, with a modified 2.6.22 version. Support for the Intel compiler has been dropped in 2023.

Since 2010, effort has been underway to build Linux with Clang, an alternative compiler for the C language; as of 12 April 2014, the official kernel could almost be compiled by Clang. The project dedicated to this effort is named LLVMLinux after the LLVM compiler infrastructure upon which Clang is built. LLVMLinux does not aim to fork either Linux or the LLVM, therefore it is a meta-project composed of patches that are eventually submitted to the upstream projects. By enabling Linux to be compiled by Clang, developers may benefit from shorter compilation times.

In 2017, developers completed upstreaming patches to support building the Linux kernel with Clang in the 4.15 release, having backported support for X86-64 and AArch64 to the 4.4, 4.9, and 4.14 branches of the stable kernel tree. Google's Pixel 2 shipped with the first Clang built Linux kernel, though patches for Pixel (1st generation) did exist. 2018 saw ChromeOS move to building kernels with Clang by default, while Android (operating system) made Clang and LLVM's linker LLD required for kernel builds in 2019. Google moved its production kernel used throughout its datacenters to being built with Clang in 2020. Today, the ClangBuiltLinux group coordinates fixes to both Linux and LLVM to ensure compatibility, both composed of members from LLVMLinux and having upstreamed patches from LLVMLinux.

Kernel debugging 

Bugs involving the Linux Kernel can be difficult to troubleshoot. This is because of the kernel's interaction with userspace and hardware; and also because they might be caused from a wider range of reasons compared to those of user programs. A few examples of the underlying causes are semantic errors in code, misuse of synchronization primitives, and incorrect hardware management.

A report of a non-fatal bug in the kernel is called an "oops"; such deviations from correct behavior of the Linux kernel may allow continued operation with compromised reliability.

A critical and fatal error is reported via the  function. It prints a message and then halts the kernel.

One of the most common techniques used to find out bugs in code is debugging by printing. For this purpose Linux provides an in-kernel API called  which stores messages in a circular buffer. Kernel messages are also exported to userland through the /dev/kmsg interface (e.g., systemd-journald reads that interface and by default append the messages to ).

Another fundamental technique for debugging a running kernel is tracing. The ftrace mechanism is a Linux internal tracer; it is used for monitoring and debugging Linux at runtime and it can also analyze user space latencies due to kernel misbehavior. Furthermore, ftrace allows users to trace Linux at boot-time.

kprobes and kretprobes can break (like debuggers in userspace) into Linux and non-disruptively collect information. kprobes can be inserted into code at (almost) any address, while kretprobes work at function return. uprobes have similar purposes but they also have some differences in usage and implementation.

With KGDB Linux can be debugged in much the same way as userspace programs. KGDB requires an additional machine that runs GDB and that is connected to the target to be debugged using a serial cable or Ethernet.

Development model 
The Linux kernel project integrates new code on a rolling basis. Software checked into the project must work and compile without error. Each kernel subsystem is assigned a maintainer who is responsible for reviewing patches against the kernel code standards and keeps a queue of patches that can be submitted to Linus Torvalds within a merge window of several weeks. Patches are merged by Torvalds into the source code of the prior stable Linux kernel release, creating the -rc release candidate for the next stable kernel. Once the merge window is closed only fixes to the new code in the development release are accepted. The -rc development release of the kernel goes through regression tests and once it is judged to be stable by Torvalds and the kernel subsystem maintainers a new Linux kernel is released and the development process starts all over again.

Developers who feel treated unfairly can report this to the Linux Foundation's Technical Advisory Board. In July 2013, the maintainer of the USB 3.0 driver Sage Sharp asked Torvalds to address the abusive commentary in the kernel development community. In 2014, Sharp backed out of Linux kernel development, saying that "The focus on technical excellence, in combination with overloaded maintainers, and people with different cultural and social norms, means that Linux kernel maintainers are often blunt, rude, or brutal to get their job done". At the linux.conf.au (LCA) conference in 2018, developers expressed the view that the culture of the community has gotten much better in the past few years. Daniel Vetter, the maintainer of the Intel drm/i915 graphics kernel driver, commented that the "rather violent language and discussion" in the kernel community has decreased or disappeared.

Laurent Pinchart asked developers for feedback on their experience with the kernel community at the 2017 Embedded Linux Conference Europe. The issues brought up were discussed a few days later at the Maintainers Summit. Concerns over the lack of consistency in how maintainers responded to patches submitted by developers were echoed by Shuah Khan, the maintainer of the kernel self-test framework. Torvalds contended that there would never be consistency in the handling of patches because different kernel subsystems have, over time, adopted different development processes. Therefore, it was agreed upon that each kernel subsystem maintainer would document the rules for patch acceptance.

Mainline Linux
The Git tree of Linus Torvalds that contains the Linux kernel is referred to as mainline Linux. Every stable kernel release originates from the mainline tree, and is frequently published on kernel.org. Mainline Linux has only solid support for a small subset of the many devices that run Linux. Non-mainline support is provided by independent projects, such as Yocto or Linaro, but in many cases the kernel from the device vendor is needed. Using a vendor kernel likely requires a board support package.

Maintaining a kernel tree outside of mainline Linux has proven to be difficult.

Mainlining refers to the effort of adding support for a device to the mainline kernel, while there was formerly only support in a fork or no support at all. This usually includes adding drivers or device tree files. When this is finished, the feature or security fix is considered mainlined.

Linux-like kernel
The maintainer of the stable branch, Greg Kroah-Hartman, has applied the term Linux-like to downstream kernel forks by vendors that add millions of lines of code to the mainline kernel. In 2019, Google stated that they wanted to use the mainline Linux kernel in Android so the number of kernel forks would be reduced. The term Linux-like has also been applied to the Embeddable Linux Kernel Subset, which does not include the full mainline Linux kernel but a small modified subset of the code.

Linux forks 

There are certain communities that develop kernels based on the official Linux. Some interesting bits of code from these forks that include Linux-libre, Compute Node Linux, INK, L4Linux, RTLinux, and User-Mode Linux (UML) have been merged into the mainline. Some operating systems developed for mobile phones initially used heavily modified versions of Linux, including Google Android, Firefox OS, HP webOS, Nokia Maemo and Jolla Sailfish OS. In 2010, the Linux community criticised Google for effectively starting its own kernel tree:

Today Android uses a customized Linux where major changes are implemented in device drivers, but some changes to the core kernel code is required. Android developers also submit patches to the official Linux that finally can boot the Android operating system. For example, a Nexus 7 can boot and run the mainline Linux.

At a 2001 presentation at the Computer History Museum, Linus Torvalds had this to say in response to a question about distributions of Linux using precisely the same kernel sources or not:

Development community conflicts 
There have been several notable conflicts among Linux kernel developers. Examples of such conflicts are:
 In July 2007, Con Kolivas announced that he would cease developing for the Linux kernel.
 In July 2009, Alan Cox quit his role as the TTY layer maintainer after disagreement with Linus Torvalds.
 In December 2010, there was a discussion between Linux SCSI maintainer James Bottomley and SCST maintainer Vladislav Bolkhovitin about which SCSI target stack should be included in the Linux kernel. This made some Linux users upset.
 In June 2012, Torvalds made it very clear that he did not agree with NVIDIA releasing its drivers as closed.
 In April 2014, Torvalds banned Kay Sievers from submitting patches to the Linux kernel for failing to deal with bugs that caused systemd to negatively interact with the kernel.
 In October 2014, Lennart Poettering accused Torvalds of tolerating the rough discussion style on Linux kernel related mailing lists and of being a bad role model.
 In March 2015, Christoph Hellwig filed a lawsuit against VMware for infringement of the copyright on the Linux kernel. Linus Torvalds made it clear that he did not agree with this and similar initiatives by calling lawyers a festering disease.

 In April 2021, a team from the University of Minnesota was found to be submitting "bad faith" patches to the kernel as part of their research. This resulted in the immediate reversion of all patches ever submitted by a member of the university. In addition, a warning was issued by a senior maintainer that any future patch from the university would be rejected on sight.

Prominent Linux kernel developers have been aware of the importance of avoiding conflicts between developers. For a long time there was no code of conduct for kernel developers due to opposition by Linus Torvalds. However, a Linux Kernel Code of Conflict was introduced on 8 March 2015. It was replaced on 16 September 2018 by a new Code of Conduct based on the Contributor Covenant. This coincided with a public apology by Torvalds and a brief break from kernel development. On 30 November 2018, complying with the Code of Conduct, Jarkko Sakkinen of Intel sent out patches replacing instances of "fuck" appearing in source code comments with suitable versions focused on the word 'hug'.

Codebase 
, the 5.11 release of the Linux kernel had around 30.34 million lines of code. Roughly 14% of the code is part of the "core" (arch, kernel and mm directories), while 60% is drivers.

Estimated cost to redevelop 

The cost to redevelop version 2.6.0 of the Linux kernel in a traditional proprietary development setting has been estimated to be US$612 million (€467M, £394M) in 2004 prices using the COCOMO person-month estimation model. In 2006, a study funded by the European Union put the redevelopment cost of kernel version 2.6.8 higher, at €882M ($1.14bn, £744M).

This topic was revisited in October 2008 by Amanda McPherson, Brian Proffitt, and Ron Hale-Evans. Using David A. Wheeler's methodology, they estimated redevelopment of the 2.6.25 kernel now costs $1.3bn (part of a total $10.8bn to redevelop Fedora 9). Again, Garcia-Garcia and Alonso de Magdaleno from University of Oviedo (Spain) estimate that the value annually added to kernel was about €100M between 2005 and 2007 and €225M in 2008, it would cost also more than €1bn (about $1.4bn as of February 2010) to develop in the European Union.

, using then-current LOC (lines of code) of a 2.6.x Linux kernel and wage numbers with David A. Wheeler's calculations it would cost approximately $3bn (about €2.2bn) to redevelop the Linux kernel as it keeps getting bigger. An updated calculation , using then-current 20,088,609 LOC (lines of code) for the 4.14.14 Linux kernel and the current US national average programmer salary of $75,506 show it would cost approximately $14,725,449,000 dollars (£11,191,341,000) to rewrite the existing code.

Maintenance and long-term support

The latest kernel version and older kernel versions are maintained separately. Most latest kernel releases were supervised by Linus Torvalds.

The Linux kernel developer community maintains a stable kernel by applying fixes for software bugs that have been discovered during the development of the subsequent stable kernel. Therefore, www.kernel.org will always list two stable kernels. The next stable Linux kernel is now released only 8 to 12 weeks later. Therefore, the Linux kernel maintainers have designated some stable kernel releases as longterm, these long-term support Linux kernels are updated with bug fixes for two or more years. , there are six longterm Linux kernels: 5.15.23, 5.10.100, 5.4.179, 4.19.229, 4.14.266, and 4.9.301. The full list of releases is at Linux kernel version history.

Relation with Linux distributions 
Most Linux users run a kernel supplied by their Linux distribution. Some distributions ship the "vanilla" or "stable" kernels. However, several Linux distribution vendors (such as Red Hat and Debian) maintain another set of Linux kernel branches which are integrated into their products. These are usually updated at a slower pace compared to the "vanilla" branch, and they usually include all fixes from the relevant "stable" branch, but at the same time they can also add support for drivers or features which had not been released in the "vanilla" version the distribution vendor started basing their branch from.

Legal aspects

Licensing terms 
Initially, Torvalds released Linux under a license which forbade any commercial use. This was changed in version 0.12 by a switch to the GNU General Public License version 2 (GPLv2). This license allows distribution and sale of possibly modified and unmodified versions of Linux but requires that all those copies be released under the same license and be accompanied by - or that, on request, free access is given to - the complete corresponding source code. Torvalds has described licensing Linux under the GPLv2 as the "best thing I ever did".

The Linux kernel is licensed explicitly under GNU General Public License version 2 only (GPL-2.0-only) with an explicit syscall exception (Linux-syscall-note), without offering the licensee the option to choose any later version, which is a common GPL extension. Contributed code must be available under GPL-compatible license.

There was considerable debate about how easily the license could be changed to use later GPL versions (including version 3), and whether this change is even desirable. Torvalds himself specifically indicated upon the release of version 2.4.0 that his own code is released only under version 2. However, the terms of the GPL state that if no version is specified, then any version may be used, and Alan Cox pointed out that very few other Linux contributors had specified a particular version of the GPL.

In September 2006, a survey of 29 key kernel programmers indicated that 28 preferred GPLv2 to the then-current GPLv3 draft. Torvalds commented, "I think a number of outsiders... believed that I personally was just the odd man out because I've been so publicly not a huge fan of the GPLv3." This group of high-profile kernel developers, including Torvalds, Greg Kroah-Hartman and Andrew Morton, commented on mass media about their objections to the GPLv3. They referred to clauses regarding DRM/tivoization, patents, "additional restrictions" and warned a Balkanisation of the "Open Source Universe" by the GPLv3. Linus Torvalds, who decided not to adopt the GPLv3 for the Linux kernel, reiterated his criticism even years later.

Loadable kernel modules 
It is debated whether some loadable kernel modules (LKMs) are to be considered derivative works under copyright law, and thereby whether or not they fall under the terms of the GPL.

In accordance with the license rules, LKMs using only a public subset of the kernel interfaces are non-derived works, thus Linux gives system administrators the mechanisms to load out-of-tree binary objects into the kernel address space.

There are some out-of-tree loadable modules that make legitimate use of the dma_buf kernel feature. GPL compliant code can certainly use it. However, a different possible use case would be Nvidia Optimus that pairs a fast GPU with an Intel integrated GPU, where the Nvidia GPU writes into the Intel framebuffer when it is active. But, Nvidia cannot use this infrastructure because it necessitates bypassing a rule that can only be used by LKMs that are also GPL. Alan Cox replied on LKML, rejecting a request from one of their engineers to remove this technical enforcement from the API. Torvalds clearly stated on the LKML that "[I] claim that binary-only kernel modules ARE derivative "by default"'".

On the other hand, Torvalds has also said that "[one] gray area in particular is something like a driver that was originally written for another operating system (i.e., clearly not a derived work of Linux in origin). THAT is a gray area, and _that_ is the area where I personally believe that some modules may be considered to not be derived works simply because they weren't designed for Linux and don't depend on any special Linux behaviour". Proprietary graphics drivers, in particular, are heavily discussed.

Whenever proprietary modules are loaded into Linux, the kernel marks itself as being "tainted", and therefore bug reports from tainted kernels will often be ignored by developers.

Firmware binary blobs 
The official kernel, that is the Linus git branch at the kernel.org repository, contains binary blobs released under the terms of the GNU GPLv2 license. Linux can also search filesystems to locate binary blobs, proprietary firmware, drivers, or other executable modules, then it can load and link them into kernel space.

When it is needed (e.g., for accessing boot devices or for speed) firmware can be built-in to the kernel, this means building the firmware into vmlinux; however this is not always a viable option for technical or legal issues (e.g., it is not permitted to do this with firmware that is non-GPL compatible, although this is quite common nonetheless).

Trademark 

Linux is a registered trademark of Linus Torvalds in the United States, the European Union, and some other countries. A legal battle over the trademark began in 1996, when William Della Croce, a lawyer who was never involved in the development of Linux, started requesting licensing fees for the use of the word Linux. After it was proven that the word was in common use long before Della Croce's claimed first use, the trademark was awarded to Torvalds.

See also

Notes

References

Further reading

External links 

 
 Linux kernel documentation index
 Linux kernel man pages
 Kernel bugzilla, and regressions for each recent kernel version
 Kernel Newbies, a source of various kernel-related information
 Kernel coverage at LWN.net, an authoritative source of kernel-related information
 Bootlin's Elixir Cross Referencer, a Linux kernel source code cross-reference
 

 
Finnish inventions
Free and open-source software
Free software programmed in C
Free system software
Linus Torvalds
Monolithic kernels
Operating systems
Software using the GPL license
Unix variants